Little Jilliby is a suburb of the Central Coast region of New South Wales, Australia. It is part of the  local government area.  At the 2016 Australian Census, Little Jilliby has a population of 120.

Little Jilliby is an area described as generally those properties on either side of Little Jilliby Road, in the valley running west from Jilliby Road. Jilliby State Conservation Area is nearby.

References

Suburbs of the Central Coast (New South Wales)